= Kasihli =

- Location in Iran
- Coordinates: 39°36′26″N 47°46′23″E
- Country: Iran
- Province: Ardabil Province
- Time zone: UTC+3:30 (IRST)
  - Summer (DST): UTC+4:30 (IRDT)

Kasihli is a village in the Ardabil Province of Iran.
